A Alao is a village in southeast Laos. It is in Nong District in Savannakhet Province.

External links
Satellite map at Maplandia.com
Location on MSN encarta map

Populated places in Savannakhet Province